Bertoua Airport  is a public use airport located  east-southeast of Bertoua, Est, Cameroon.

See also
List of airports in Cameroon

References

External links 
 Airport record for Bertoua Airport at Landings.com
 

Airports in Cameroon
East Region (Cameroon)